Rain is a mostly male given name.

People named Rain include:
 Rain Chudori (born 1994), Indonesian writer, curator, screenwriter, artist and actress
 Rain Dove (born 1989), American model, actor and activist
 Rain Eensaar (born 1974), Estonian orienteer, rogainer and adventure racer
 Rain Epler (born 1977), Estonian politician 
 Rain Graves (born 1974), American author of horror, fantasy, science fiction and poetry
 Rain Karlson (born 1992), Estonian boxer
 Rain Lee (born 1983), Hong Kong actress and singer
 Rain Phoenix (born 1972), American actress, musician, and singer
 Rain Pryor, American actress and comedian
 Rain Raadik (born 1989), Estonian basketball player
 Rain Rosimannus (born 1968), Estonian politician and sociologist
 Rain Simmul (born 1965), Estonian actor
 Rain Tolk (born 1977), Estonian actor
 Rain Veideman (born 1991), Estonian basketball player 
 Rain Vessenberg (born 1975), Estonian footballer

References

Given names
Estonian masculine given names
English-language feminine given names
English feminine given names